Pokfulam is one of the 17 constituencies of the Southern District Council of Hong Kong. The seat elects one member of the council every four years. It has been held by Independent Paulus Johannes Zimmerman since the 2010-byelection.

The constituency loosely covers Pok Fu Lam with estimated population of 21,476.

Councillors represented

1982 to 1985

1985 to 1994

1994 to present

Election results

2010s

2000s

1990s

1980s

Citations

References
2011 District Council Election Results (Southern)
Pokfulam District Council By-election, 2010
2007 District Council Election Results (Southern)
2003 District Council Election Results (Southern)
1999 District Council Election Results (Southern)
 

Constituencies of Hong Kong
Constituencies of Southern District Council
1982 establishments in Hong Kong
Constituencies established in 1982